María de la Luz Arias Staines (born 27 December 1941) is a Mexican politician affiliated with the Ecologist Green Party of Mexico. As of 2014 she served as Deputy of the LIX Legislature of the Mexican Congress as a plurinominal representative.

References

1941 births
Living people
Women members of the Chamber of Deputies (Mexico)
Members of the Chamber of Deputies (Mexico)
Ecologist Green Party of Mexico politicians
Place of birth missing (living people)
21st-century Mexican politicians
21st-century Mexican women politicians
Deputies of the LIX Legislature of Mexico